Wilbur Cobb may refer to:

Wilbur James Cobb or Jimmy Cobb (1929–2020), American jazz drummer
Wilbur Cobb, character from The Ren & Stimpy Show animated series